This is a list of transfers involving Top 14 teams between the end of the 2012–13 season and the end of the 2013–14 season. Top 14 is the highest French rugby union league.

Bayonne

Players In
 Gert Muller from  SU Agen 
 JC Janse van Rensburg from  Lions 
 Lisiate Fa'aoso from  SU Agen 
 Jean Monribot from  SU Agen 
 Opeti Fonua from  SU Agen 
 Mathieu Bélie from  Racing Metro 
 Stephen Brett from  Toyota Verblitz
 Saimoni Vaka from  SU Agen 
 Martin Bustos Moyano from  Montpellier

Players Out
 Renaud Boyoud to  US Dax 
 Walter Desmaison to  Racing Metro 
 Matt Graham to  Union Bordeaux-Bègles 
 Rob Linde retired
 François Carillo retired
 Marc Baget to  Beziers
 Cédric Garcia to  Castres Olympique 
 Benjamin Boyet released
 Jacques-Louis Potgieter to  US Dax 
 Thibault Lacroix to  Union Bordeaux-Bègles
 Lionel Mazars to  SU Agen 
 Thibault Visensang to  SC Albi 
 Cédric Heymans retired
 Mike Phillips to  Racing Metro

Biarritz

Players In
 Alexandre Menini from   Stade Montois 
 Joshua Furno from  RC Narbonne 
 Addison Lockley from  Moseley
 Ueleni Fono from  SU Agen 
 Daniel Waenga from  Hawke's Bay Magpies 
 Giovanni Cipriani from  Viadana 
 Paul Perez from  Samoa Sevens 
 Joe Pietersen from  Stormers

Players Out
 Benoît August retired
 Jérôme Thion retired
 Wenceslas Lauret to  Racing Metro 
 Talalelei Grey to  Waratahs
 Jean-Pascal Barraque to  Toulouse
 Marcelo Bosch to  Saracens 
 Dane Haylett-Petty to  Western Force

Bordeaux

Players In
 Jean-Baptiste Poux from  Toulouse
 Benjamin Sa  from  Racing Metro 
 Clément Maynadier from  SC Albi 
 Beñat Auzqui from  US Tyrosse 
 Jean-Charles Fidinde from  Clermont Auvergne 
 Aliki Fakate from  Montpellier 
 Matt Graham from  Bayonne 
 Jandré Marais from  Sharks 
 Jean-Blaise Lespinasse from  US Montauban 
 Marco Tauleigne from  CS Bourgoin-Jallieu 
 Taiasina Tuifu'a from  Newcastle Falcons 
 Poutasi Luafutu from  CA Brive 
 Pierre Bernard from  Castres Olympique 
 Romain Lonca from  Stade Hendayais 
 Thibault Lacroix from  Bayonne 
 Gilen Queheille from  SA Mauléon 
 Robert Lilomaiava from  Samoa Sevens
 Jean-Baptiste Peyras-Loustalet from  Beziers

Players Out
 Hikairo Forbes to  La Rochelle 
 Tamato Leupolu to  CA Brive 
 Nicolas Decamps to  Section Paloise 
 Yassin Boutemane to  US Dax 
 Franck Labbé retired
 Stephane Fort to  Avenir Castanéen Rugby 
 François Tisseau to  US Carcassonne 
 Andrew Chauveau to  RC Narbonne 
 Justin Purll to  USA Perpignan 
 Damien Larrieu to  FC Auch Gers 
 Julien Seron to  US Carcassonne 
 Camille Lopez to   USA Perpignan 
 Andrew Ma'ilei to  CA Brive 
 Michel Denetre to  CS Bourgoin-Jallieu 
 Avenisi Vasuinubu to  US Colomiers 
 Thierry Brana to  US Carcassonne 
 Lachie Munro to  Lyon

Brive

Players In
 Kevin Buys from  Southern Kings 
 Tamato Leupolu from  Union Bordeaux-Bègles 
 Karlen Asieshvili from  Stade Aurillacois 
 Simon Pinet from  Stade Aurillacois 
 Fabien Laurent from  Oyonnax
 Kieran Murphy from  Scarlets 
 Sisa Koyamaibole from  Union Athlétique Libournaise 
 Damien Neveu from  La Rochelle 
 Thomas Sanchou from  Castres Olympique
 Andrew Ma'ilei from  Union Bordeaux-Bègles 
 Alfi Mafi from  Western Force 
 Venione Voretamaya from  SC Albi 
 Gaëtan Germain from  Racing Metro

Players Out
 Davit Khinchagishvili to  Racing Metro 
 Irakli Natriashvili released
 Alexandre Barozzi released
 Pablo Henn to  Limoges
 Pat Barnard released
 Quentin Viozelange to  US Colomiers
 Retief Uys retired
 Simon Azoulai to  SC Tulle 
 Poutasi Luafutu to  Union Bordeaux-Bègles 
 Mike Blair to  Newcastle Falcons 
 Benjamin Caminati to  FC Auch Gers 
 Jamie Noon to  SC Tulle
 Yann Fior retired
 Jacques Boussuge released
 Julien Caminati to  FC Grenoble 
 Léo Griffoul released

Castres

Players In
 George Marich from  RC Narbonne 
 Richie Gray from  Sale Sharks 
 Julien Tomas from  Montpellier 
 Cédric Garcia from  Bayonne 
 Santiago Fernandez from  Montpellier 
 Rémy Grosso from  Lyon 
 Geoffrey Palis from  SC Albi

Players Out
 Adrien Pélissié to  Stade Aurillacois 
 Iosefa Tekori to  Toulouse 
 Matthias Rolland retired
 Wessel Jooste to  SU Agen 
 Thierry Lacrampe to  Clermont Auvergne 
 Pierre Bernard to  Union Bordeaux-Bègles 
 Thomas Sanchou to  CA Brive 
 Florian Vialelle to  SC Albi 
 Marc Andreu to  Racing Metro 
 Brice Trevisan to  Avenir Castanéen Rugby

Clermont

Players In
 Thierry Lacrampe from  Castres Olympique 
 Gavin Hume from  USA Perpignan

Players Out
 Kevin Boudot to  US Bressane 
 Mike Corbel to  La Rochelle
 Anthony Maury to  USO Nivernaise 
 Jean-Charles Fidinde to  Union Bordeaux-Bègles 
 Baptiste Hézard to  Stade Aurillacois 
 Cameron Pierce to  Section Paloise 
 Loann Goujon to  La Rochelle 
 Viktor Kolelishvili to  Lyon 
 Hugues Bastide to  USO Nevers 
 Kevin Senio to  Montluçon 
 Nicolas Vuillemin to  Oyonnax
 David Skrela to  US Colomiers 
 Alexandre Mourot to  Lyon 
 Pierre Santalier to  La Rochelle 
 Kini Murimurivalu to  La Rochelle 
 Anthony Floch to  Montpellier

Grenoble

Players In
 Dan Palmer from  Brumbies 
 Richard Choirat from  Section Paloise 
 Hendrik Roodt from  Lions 
 Peter Kimlin from  Brumbies 
 Cédric Béal from  US Dax 
 Nicolas Bézy from  Stade Français 
 Mathieu Lorée from  SU Agen 
 Olly Barkley from  Racing Metro 
 Geoffroy Messina from  Toulon 
 Ratu Alipate Raitini from  Cronulla Sharks 
 Julien Caminati from  CA Brive 
 Benjamin Thiery from  Montpellier

Players Out
 Erwan Iaptef to  Oyonnax
 Ruaan du Preez to  Oyonnax
 Lotu Tokeihao to  Stade Aurillacois 
 Karim Kouider to  US Carcassonne 
 Florent Fourcade  to  SC Albi 
 Alexandre Pollard released
 Jonathan Pélissié to  Montpellier 
 Clément Darbo to  SU Agen 
 Nicolas Laharrague to  Tarbes 
 Aloisio Butonidualevu to  US Carcassonne 
 Aaron Bancroft to  US Carcassonne 
 Lucas Dupont to  Montpellier 
 Viliame Waqaseduadua to  SU Agen 
 Joaquin Tuculet to  Union Bordeaux Begles
 Pierre-Yves Montagnat released

Montpellier

Players In
 Nicolas Mas from  USA Perpignan 
 Mickaël Ivaldi from  Toulon 
 Thomas Bianchin from  Racing Metro 
 Sitaleki Timani from  Waratahs 
 Robins Tchale-Watchou from  USA Perpignan 
 Jim Hamilton from  Gloucester Rugby 
 Jonathan Pélissié from  Grenoble 
 Wynand Olivier from  Bulls 
 JP du Plessis from  Stormers 
 Hamish Gard from  NTT DoCoMo Red Hurricanes 
 Anthony Tuitavake from  NEC Green Rockets 
 Rene Ranger from  Blues 
 Lucas Dupont from  Grenoble 
 Anthony Floch from  Clermont Auvergne

Players Out
 Giorgi Jgenti to  USA Perpignan 
 Kevin Kervarec to  Beziers
 Wilfried Hounkpatin to  RC Narbonne 
 Vincent Pelo to  Bourgoin
 Fabien Dorey to  RC Aubenas 
 Agustin Creevy to  Worcester Warriors 
 Rassie Jansen van Vuuren to  La Rochelle 
 Mickaël Ladhuie to  US Montauban 
 Drikus Hancke retired
 Aliki Fakate to  Union Bordeaux-Bègles 
 Rémy Martin to  Beziers 
 Julien Tomas to  Castres Olympique 
 Santiago Fernandez to  Castres Olympique 
 Paul Bosch to  USO Nevers 
 Taleta Tupuola to  US Montauban 
 Shontayne Hape released
 Matthew Carraro to  Waratahs
 Martin Bustos Moyano to  Bayonne 
 Lucas González Amorosino to  Oyonnax
 Benjamin Thiery to  Grenoble

Oyonnax

Players In
 Erwan Iaptef from  Grenoble
 Ruaan du Preez from  Grenoble 
 Neil Clark from  Exeter Chiefs
 Damian Browne from  Leinster
 Damien Lagrange from  SU Agen 
 Viliami Ma'afu unattached
 Fabien Cibray from  Lyon 
 Agustin Figuerola from  CA Brive
 Nicolas Vuillemin from  Clermont Auvergne
 Conrad Barnard from  SU Agen 
 Pierre Aguillon from  US Carcassonne 
 Guillaume Bousses from  Racing Metro 
 Dug Codjo from  US Carcassonne 
 Jean-François Coux from  SU Agen 
 Silvère Tian from  SU Agen

Players Out
 Yann Resseguier to  Bourgoin 
 Jan Volschenk released
 Cyril Blanchard to  AS Mâcon 
 Valeni Tiatia released
 Fabien Laurent to  CA Brive 
 Quentin Witt to  US Bressane 
 Julien Audy to  La Rochelle 
 Etienne Ninet to  US Annecy 
 Antoine Renaud to  Stade Aurillacois 
 Romain Boscus to  Stade Rodez 
 Jean-Emmanuel Cassin to  US Bressane 
 Lole Tualaulelei released
 Jérémy Aicardi to  Bourgoin 
 Quentin Nauroy to  Saint-Estève XIII

Perpignan

Players In
 Paulică Ion from  London Welsh
 Giorgi Jgenti from  Montpellier
 Justin Purll from  Union Bordeaux-Bègles 
 Karl Château from  Toulouse 
 Dewaldt Duvenage from  Stormers 
 Camille Lopez from  Union Bordeaux-Bègles 
 Tommaso Allan unattached
 Tommaso Benvenuti from  Benetton Treviso
 Watisoni Votu from   Exeter Chiefs 
 Wandile Mjekevu from  Sharks

Players Out
 Nicolas Mas to  Montpellier 
 Jérôme Schuster to  Leicester Tigers 
 Jérémy Castex to  Lyon 
 Maxime Delonca to  US Dax
 Robins Tchale-Watchou to  Montpellier 
 Yohan Vivalda to  US Colomiers 
 Romain Bézian to  Tarbes
 Gilles Arnaudiès to  RC Narbonne 
 Henry Tuilagi retired
 David Mélé to  Leicester Tigers 
 Gilles Bosch to  US Carcassonne 
 Gavin Hume to  Clermont Auvergne 
 Fabrice Catala to  US Colomiers 
 Adrien Planté to  Racing Metro 
 Armand Battle to  US Colomiers 
 Farid Sid to  Lézignan Sangliers

Racing Métro

Players In
 Soane Tonga'uiha from  Northampton Saints 
 Brian Mujati from  Northampton Saints 
 Walter Desmaison from  Bayonne 
 Davit Khinchagishvili from  CA Brive 
 Virgile Lacombe from  Southern Kings 
 Juandré Kruger from  Bulls 
 Wenceslas Lauret from  Biarritz Olympique
 Dan Lydiate from  Newport Gwent Dragons 
 Laurent Magnaval from  Stade Montois 
 Johnny Sexton from  Leinster 
 Jamie Roberts from  Cardiff Blues 
 Marc Andreu from  Castres Olympique 
 Adrien Planté from  USA Perpignan 
 Benjamin Lapeyre from  Toulon

Players Out
 Benjamin Sa to  Union Bordeaux Bègles 
 Juan Pablo Orlandi to  Bath Rugby 
 Andrea Lo Cicero retired
 Mikaele Tuugahala retired
 Thomas Bianchin to  Montpellier 
 Benjamin Noirot to  Toulon 
 Santiago Dellapè retired
 Julien Côme to  FC Auch Gers
 Álvaro Galindo released
 Johnny Leo'o to  Lille Métropole Rugby 
 Mathieu Bélie to  Bayonne 
 Olly Barkley to  Grenoble 
 Guillaume Boussès to  Oyonnax
 Mirco Bergamasco to  Rugby Rovigo Delta 
 Albert Vulivuli to  La Rochelle 
 Julien Jane to  France Sevens 
 Julien Saubade to  France Sevens 
 Sireli Bobo to  NTT DoCoMo Red Hurricanes 
 Gaëtan Germain to  CA Brive

Stade Français

Players In
 Heinke van der Merwe from  Leinster 
 Sakaria Taulafo from  London Wasps 
 Davit Kubriashvili from  Toulon 
 Sylvain Nicolas from  Toulouse 
 Richard Kingi from  Melbourne Rebels 
 Morné Steyn from  Bulls 
 Meyer Bosman from  Sharks 
 Andrea Cocagi from  L'Aquila 
 Digby Ioane from  Reds 
 Marty Ioane unattached

Players Out
 Tetaz Chaparro to   Newport Gwent Dragons 
 Stan Wright released
 Jérémy Bécasseau to  Worcester Warriors 
 Lei Tomiki to  RC Narbonne
 Arthur Chollon to  US Dax
 Nicolas Bezy to  Grenoble 
 Felipe Contepomi retired
 Paul Warwick to  Worcester Warriors
 Morgan Turinui to  Lille Métropole Rugby
 Gavin Williams  to  Montluçon 
 Paul Sackey to  Harlequins
 Francis Fainifo released

Toulon

Players In
 Emmanuel Felsina from  Aix-en-Provence 
 Martin Castrogiovanni from  Leicester Tigers 
 Benjamin Noirot from  Racing Metro
 Ali Williams from  Blues 
 Facundo Isa unattached
 Michael Claassens from  Bath Rugby 
 Bryan Habana from  Stormers 
 Drew Mitchell from  Waratahs 
 Joshua Tuisova from  Fiji Sevens

Players Out
 Gethin Jenkins to  Cardiff Blues 
 Davit Kubriashvili to  Stade Francais
 Mickaël Ivaldi to  Montpellier
 Simon Shaw released
 Romain Manchia to  RC Narbonne 
 Etienne Herjean to  RC Narbonne 
 Geoffroy Messina to  Grenoble 
 Benjamin Lapeyre to  Racing Metro

Toulouse

Players In
 Chiliboy Ralepelle from  Bulls 
 Iosefa Tekori from  Castres Olympique -
 Yacouba Camara from  RC Massy 
 Jano Vermaak from  Bulls 
 Jean-Pascal Barraque from  Biarritz Olympique 
 Hosea Gear from  Highlanders

Players Out
 Jean Baptiste Poux to  Union Bordeaux Bègles 
 Gary Botha released
 William Servat retired
 Cyril Deligny to  RC Narbonne 
 Russlan Boukerou to  FC Auch Gers 
 Jean Bouilhou to  Section Paloise 
 Karl Château to  USA Perpignan 
 Sylvain Nicolas to  Stade Français 
 Luke Burgess to  Melbourne Rebels 
 Yannick Jauzion retired
 Maxime Payen to  SC Albi

References

2013-14
2013–14 Top 14 season